Anderson Arias Zambrano (born 20 April 1987) is a Venezuelan professional footballer who plays as a striker for Dominican club Atlético Pantoja.

Early life
Arias was born in San Cristóbal, in Venezuela's Táchira state.

Club career
Arias began his career with Venezuelan Primera División side Deportivo Táchira, scoring 27 goals in 130 career appearances. While on loan with Zulia in 2010, he scored seven goals in fourteen appearances.

International career
In 2007, Arias made four appearances for the Venezuelan U20 team. On 22 August 2007, Arias made his debut for the senior team against Paraguay.

References

External links

1987 births
Living people
Association football forwards
Venezuelan footballers
People from San Cristóbal, Táchira
Venezuelan expatriate footballers
Expatriate footballers in the Dominican Republic
Venezuelan expatriate sportspeople in the Dominican Republic
Deportivo Táchira F.C. players
Zulia F.C. players
Deportivo La Guaira players
Monagas S.C. players
Margarita F.C. players
Atlántico FC players
Club Barcelona Atlético players
Universidad O&M FC players
Atlético Pantoja players
Venezuelan Primera División players
Venezuelan Segunda División players
Liga Dominicana de Fútbol players
Venezuela under-20 international footballers
Venezuela international footballers